Uchechukwu Sampson Ogah (born 22 December 1969) is the current Nigerian Minister of State for Mines and Steel Development. An oil magnate, entrepreneur, investor and philanthropist, Ogah is the President of Master Energy Group, a conglomerate with over 15 subsidiaries and interests across a variety of industries, amongst is Masters Energy Oil and Gas Ltd. Ogah holds the Nigerian national honour, the Officer of the Order of the Niger (OON). He was nominated for a ministerial appointment by President Muhammadu Buhari and was later appointed as Minister of State, Mines and Steel Development  on Wednesday, August 21, 2019.

Early life and education
Ogah was born to Chief Wilson, a sanitary inspector and retired railway staff and Ezinne Pauline  Ogah of Onuaku Uturu, Isuikwuato Local Government Area of Abia State.

Family life and career 
Ogah is married to Ngozi Sabina Ogah, a financial analyst. Ogah spent 10 years in the banking sector. He started with his National Youth Service at NAL Bank PLC. Thereafter, he took up full employment at All States Trust Bank and spent about two years in the bank before joining Zenith Bank in 1997, where he rose to the position of Assistant General Manager (AGM) before resigning in 2007.

Philanthropy
He is said to have electrified villages in Uturu Community, built prototypal houses for the entire community and also constructed a 5,000 capacity auditorium in Abia state University (ABSU) Uturu.

Politics
Ogah has contested for the seat of the governor of Abia state, twice, first under the Peoples Democratic Party and the ruling All Progressives Congress.

Ogah was nominated for ministerial appointment by President Muhammadu Buhari on July 23, 2019 along with 42 other nominees. During his senatorial screening on July 24, he narrated his plans on how to work on Nigerian refineries as well as his plans for the Nigerian currency rate. 
Ogah was confirmed for ministerial appointment by the Senate on July 30  and on August 21, 2019 was confirmed and sworn in as the Minister of State for Mines and Steel Development.

References

External links

hubfactoryblog.com

1969 births
Nigerian businesspeople in the oil industry
Living people
Nigerian businesspeople
Nigerian philanthropists
People from Abia State
University of Nigeria alumni
Olabisi Onabanjo University alumni
University of Lagos alumni